The Lake Superior Zoo, previously known as the Duluth Zoo, is an Association of Zoos and Aquariums (AZA) accredited zoo in Duluth, Minnesota.

Founding
The Lake Superior Zoo was founded in 1923 by a West Duluth businessman, Bert Onsgard, when he built a pen for his white tail deer "Billy".  This helped his vision spread through the community who in turn helped him build the zoo. The Pittsburgh Steel Company donated a rail car of fencing, people donated exotic pets, and school children raised money to buy two lion cubs. A bridge was built over Kingsbury Creek, which runs through the zoo. The zoo went through some difficult years during the Great Depression but eventually managed to build an elephant house. After some very successful years it acquired more animals more native to the area.

Collection
Bessie, the elephant, was one of the zoo's first star attractions. She came to the zoo at the age of 12 in 1937 when the elephant house opened. The zoo's website states:

Before perimeter fencing was installed around the zoo, Bessie would often wander off the zoo grounds and go "visiting." One recounting of an event tells of a neighbor who had to call a zookeeper one evening because Bessie was standing on his front porch. In his haste, the zookeeper ran out the door in his pajamas to retrieve Bessie. When he got there, he simply took her trunk, pulled it over his shoulder, and walked her back to the zoo.

Bessie remained at the zoo until she died in 1974 at the age of 49.

Valerie was  a Himalayan black bear who had been a mascot for a World War II bomber unit. She was donated to the zoo in 1946.

Mr. Magoo was a mongoose who was smuggled into  Duluth. It had been a pet on a ship that sailed from Madras (now Chennai), India to Duluth. After arriving, the seaman who had smuggled him in decided the troublesome animal needed a new home, and donated him to the zoo. However, federal law prohibited the possession of a mongoose and it was ordered that it be euthanized. Following much public outcry about the order, Secretary of the Interior Stewart Udall granted a pardon that spared his life. Mr. Magoo remained at the Duluth zoo until his death in 1968.

Bubba was a polar bear loved for his personality and playfulness. Bubba was 17 years old and passed away due to liver disease on August 8th, 2007. As a cub, Bubba came to Lake Superior Zoo in 1990.

References

External links

Zoos in Minnesota
Duluth, Minnesota